Al Qahirah District is a district of the Taiz Governorate, Yemen. As of 2003, the district had a population of 149,394 inhabitants.

Location

It is located in the middle of Taiz city. it is bordered to the north by At Ta'iziyah, Sabir Al Mawadim to the south, Salh to the east and Al Mudhaffar to the west.

References

Districts of Taiz Governorate